Parks in Oakland, California.

 25th Street Mini Park —  — 25th Street, Oakland, CA
 85th Avenue Mini Park —  — 1712 85th Avenue, Oakland, CA 94621
 88th Avenue Mini Park —  — 1722 88th Avenue, Oakland, CA 94621
 Allendale Park —  — 3711 Suter Street, Oakland, CA 94619
 Arroyo Viejo Park —  — 7701 Krause Avenue, Oakland, CA 94605
 Avenue Terrance Park —  — 4369 Bennett Place, Oakland, CA 94602
 Bella Vista Park —  — 1025 East 28th Street, Oakland, CA
 Brookdale Park —  — 2535 High Street, Oakland, CA 94601
 Burckhalter Park —  — 4062 Edwards Avenue, Oakland, CA 94605
 Bushrod Park —  — 560 59th Street, Oakland, CA 94609
 Carney Park —  — 10501 Acalanes Drive, Oakland, CA 94603
 Central Reservoir Park —  — 2506 East 29th Street, Oakland, CA 94602
 Cesar Chavez Park — Foothill Boulevard, Oakland, CA
 Chabot Park —  — 6850 Chabot Road, Oakland, CA 94618
 Channel Park —  — 1 10th Street & 21 7th Street, Oakland, CA 94607
 Chinese Garden Park —  — 7th Street & Harrison Street, Oakland, CA
 Clinton Square Park —  — 1230 6th Avenue, Oakland, CA 94606
 Colby Park —  — 61st & Colby Street, Oakland, CA
 Coliseum Gardens Park —  — 966 66th Avenue, Oakland, CA 94621
 Columbian Gardens Park —  — 9920 Empire Road, Oakland, CA 94603
 Concordia Park —  — 2901 64th Avenue, Oakland, CA
 Crescent Park —  — Chester Street, Oakland, CA
 Cypress Freeway Memorial Park — 14th and Mandela Parkway, Oakland, CA 94607
 DeFremery Park —  — 1651 Adeline Street, Oakland, CA 94607
 Dimond Park —  — 3860 Hanly Road, Oakland, CA 94602
 Dunsmuir Estate Park —  — 61 Covington Street, Oakland, CA 94605
 Durant Mini Park —  — 29th Street & MLK Jr Way, Oakland, CA
 Eastshore Park —  — 550 El Embarcadero & Lakeshore Ave, Oakland, CA 94610
 Elmhurst Park — 1800 98th Avenue, Oakland, CA 94603
 Elmhurst Plaza Park —  — 9700 C Street, Oakland, CA 94603
 Estuary Channel Park —  — 5 Embarcadero, Oakland, CA 94606
 Fitzgerald Park — Fitzgerald Street & Peralta Street, Oakland, CA
 FM Smith Park —  — 1969 Park Boulevard, Oakland, CA 94606
 Foothill Meadows Extension —  — 1600 38th Avenue, Oakland, CA 94601
 Foothill Meadows Park —  — 3705 Foothill Boulevard, Oakland, CA 94601
 Frog Park (Rockridge-Temescal Greenbelt); Along Temescal Creek, Hudson Street to Redondo Street
 Franklin Park —  — 1010 East 15th Street, Oakland, CA 94606
 Fruitvale Bridge Park —  — 3205 Alameda Avenue, Oakland, CA 94601
 Garfield Park —  — 2260 Foothill Boulevard, Oakland, CA 94606
 Glen Echo Park —  — Panama Court & Monte Vista Avenue, Oakland, CA
 Golden Gate Park — 1075 62nd St, Oakland, CA 94608
 Grove Shafter Park —  — Martin Luther King Jr Way & 36th Street, Oakland, CA 94609
 Hardy Dog Park —  — 491 Hardy Street, Oakland, CA 94618
 Helen McGregor Plaza Park —  — MLK Jr Way & 5210 West Street, Oakland, CA
 Henry J. Kaiser Memorial Park; 1900 Rashida Muhammad St, Oakland, CA 94612
 Holly Mini Park —  — 9830 Holly Street, Oakland, CA 94603
 Ira Jinkins Park —  — 9175 Edes Avenue, Oakland, CA 94601
 Jefferson Square —  — 618 Jefferson Street, Oakland, CA 94607
 Joaquin Miller Park —  — 3590 Sanborn Drive, Oakland, CA 94602
 Joseph Knowland State Arboretum and Park  — Golf Links Road, Oakland, CA 94605
 Kennedy Tract Park —  — 26th Avenue & East 9th Street, Oakland, CA
 Lafayette Square Park —  — 635 11th Street, Oakland, CA 94607
 Lakeside Park —  — 666 Bellevue Avenue, Oakland, CA 94610
 Lazear Park —  — 850 - 29th Avenue, Oakland, CA 94601
 Leona Canyon Regional Open Space Preserve
 Lincoln Square Park —  — 261 11th Street, Oakland, CA 94607
 Linden Park —  — 998 42nd Street, Oakland, CA 94609
 Lowell Park —  — 1180 14th Street, Oakland, CA 94607
 Madison Square Park —  — 810 Jackson Street, Oakland, CA 94607
 Mandana Plaza Park —  — 600 Mandana Ave & Lakeshore Ave, Oakland, CA
 Manzanita Park —  — 2701 22nd Avenue, Oakland, CA 94606
 Marston Campbell Park —  — 17th Street & West Street, Oakland, CA
 Maxwell Park —  — 4618 Allendale Avenue, Oakland, CA 94619
 McClymonds Mini Park —  — 2528 Linden Street, Oakland, CA 94607
 McCrea Park —  — 4460 Shepherd Street, Oakland, CA 94619
 Montclair Park —  — 6300 Moraga Avenue, Oakland, CA 94611
 Morcom Rose Garden —  — 700 Jean Street, Oakland, CA 94610
 Mosswood Park —  — 3612 Webster Street, Oakland, CA 94609
 Nicol Park —  — Nicol Avenue & Collidge Avenue, Oakland, CA
 Oak Glen Park —  — 3390 Richmond Boulevard, Oakland, CA
 Oak Park —  — 3239 Kempton Avenue, Oakland, CA
 Oakland Zoo
 Ostrander Park —  — 6151 Broadway Terrace, Oakland, CA 94618
 Park Boulevard Plaza Park —  — 2100 Park Boulevard, Oakland, CA
 Peralta Hacienda Park —  — 2500 34th Avenue, Oakland, CA 94601
 Peralta Oaks Park —  — Peralta Oaks & 106th Avenue, Oakland, CA
 Peralta Park —  — 94 East 10th Street, Oakland, CA
 Piedmont Plaza Park —  — 4182 Piedmont Avenue, Oakland, CA 94611
 Pine Knoll Park —  — Lakeshore Ave & Hanover Ave, Oakland, CA
 Pinto Park —  — 5000 Redwood Road, Oakland, CA 94619
 Poplar Park —  — 3131 Union Street, Oakland, CA 94607
 Rainbow Park —  — 5800 International Boulevard, Oakland, CA 94621
 Rancho Peralta Park — 34 East 10th Street, Oakland, CA
 Redwood Heights Park —  — 3883 Aliso Avenue, Oakland, CA 94619
 Rockridge Park —  — 6090 Rockridge Boulevard, Oakland, CA 94618
 Saint Andrews Park —  — 32nd Street & San Pablo Avenue, Oakland, CA
 San Antonio Park —  — 1701 East 19th Street, Oakland, CA 94606
 Sanborn Park —  — 1637 Fruitval Avenue, Oakland, CA 94601
 Sequoia Lodge Park —  — 2666 Mountain Boulevard, Oakland, CA 94611
 Sheffield Village Park —  — 247 Marlow Drive, Oakland, CA 94605
 Snow Park —  — 19th Street & Harrison Street, Oakland, CA
 Sobrante Park —  — 470 El Paseo Drive, Oakland, CA 94603
 South Prescott Park — 3rd Street/Chester Avenue, Oakland, CA 94607
 Splash Pad Park —  — Grand Avenue & Lakepark, Oakland, CA
 Stonehurst Park —  — 10315 E Street, Oakland, CA
 Tassafaronga Park —  — 85th Avenue & E Street, Oakland, CA
 Temescal Creek Park —  — Cavour & Clifton Street, Oakland, CA
 Union Plaza Park —  — 3399 Peralta Street, Oakland, CA 94608
 Union Point Park — 2311 Embarcadero, Oakland, CA 94606
 Vantage Point Park —  — 1198 13th Avenue, Oakland, CA 94606
 Verdese Carter Park —  — 9600 Sunnyside Street, Oakland, CA 94603
 Wade Johnson Park —  — 1250 Kirkham Street, Oakland, CA 94607
 Willow Mini Park —  — 14th Street & Willow Street, Oakland, CA
 Wood Park —  — 2920 McKillop Road, Oakland, CA 94602

References 

Oakland, California
Parks